Idunneset, also called Indunneset Point, is a headland in Gustav V Land at Nordaustlandet, Svalbard. It is located at the northern side of Wahlenbergfjorden, east of the glacier Bragebreen.

References

Headlands of Nordaustlandet